William Swords (21 July 1942 – 19 October 2007) was an Irish archer. He competed in the men's individual event at the 1980 Summer Olympics.

References

1942 births
2007 deaths
Irish male archers
Olympic archers of Ireland
Archers at the 1980 Summer Olympics
Place of birth missing